Barentsburg is the second-largest settlement in Svalbard, Norway, with about 455 inhabitants. A coal mining town, the settlement is almost entirely made up of ethnic Russians and Ukrainians.

History

Rijpsburg, a now abandoned Dutch settlement on Spitsbergen on Cape Boheman (Bohemanflya), at the north site of Nordfjorden in the Isfjord, stood roughly diagonally opposite Longyearbyen. The Rotterdam-based Van der Eb and Dresselhuys Scheepvaartmaatschappij (ship-building company) built it in 1920, using prefabricated huts, for the mining of coal. Twelve Dutch staff and 52 German miners started mining coal here that year.

The Dutch Spitsbergen Company, founded in 1920, bought a mine in Green Harbour from the Russians and mined coal from 1921 to 1926. The company renamed its settlement Barentsburg after the Dutch explorer Willem Barentsz. In 1932 the company sold the mine, including its settlement Barentsburg, to the Russian trust Arktikugol.

2006 fire
On October 17, 2006, Norwegian inspectors detected a smouldering underground fire in Barentsburg, prompting fears that an open fire might break out, which would have forced the total evacuation of Barentsburg for an indefinite period of time, and would also have caused environmental problems of unknown magnitude for the entire archipelago. The fire was later contained. Coal mining resumed at the end of 2010.

Status

Under the terms of the Svalbard Treaty of 1920, citizens of signatory countries have equal rights to exploit natural resources, and as a result Russia, along with Norway (via the Sveagruva mine and Mine 7), maintains mining operations on Svalbard. However, as Svalbard is under Norwegian sovereignty, the Russian government is represented in Barentsburg by a consulate. This is the northernmost diplomatic mission of any kind in the world.

Consequently, the town has a Norwegian postcode, 9178. Similarly, it uses Norwegian telephone numbering.

Economy

Barentsburg started as a Dutch mining town in the 1920s. In 1932 the Dutch sold their concession to the Soviet Union. Since 1932 the Russian state-owned Arktikugol (Russian for "arctic coal") trust has been operating on Svalbard and the main economic activity in Barentsburg is coal mining by Arktikugol. The coal is usually exported to Northern European buyers. The town relies entirely on mainland Russia for food and coinage. There have been instances in which not enough food was sent, and aid packages were sent from Longyearbyen. Tourism is now being developed, but does not yet generate enough income to revive the town.

The majority of workers and inhabitants are Russians and Ukrainians. After the breakup of the Soviet Union, the economy of Barentsburg has been in steady decline, and population, which once numbered around a thousand, has decreased drastically.

Russia has said it intends to build a facility in Barentsburg to process fish for export.

Transportation
The distance from Longyearbyen to Barentsburg is about  but there are no roads connecting the two settlements. Most contact between the two is by boat, snowmobile, or helicopter. The port is located in the middle of Barentsburg. Tourists usually arrive via a 2-3-hour boat trip from Longyearbyen. The coal is freighted by ship.

Climate
Barentsburg features a tundra climate (ETs under the Köppen climate classification), with short, dry, chilly summers and long, very cold, snowy winters, though winters here are noticeably warmer than winters in a number of locations with tundra climates. Due to the fact that the town is located at a latitude approaching 80 degrees, only four months of the year have average temperatures above freezing, and in no month does the average monthly temperature exceed , meaning it is north of the tree line. Average low temperatures during the winter routinely drop below . The town typically experiences snowfall in every month of the year.

Science and culture

The Barentsburg Pomor Museum presents Pomor culture, Arctic flora and fauna, and archaeological objects preserved in the permafrost. It is open when the daily, summer-only boat from Longyearbyen arrives, and by special arrangement. There is an athletic complex, including a swimming pool with heated seawater.

Every summer, several dozen geophysicists, geologists, archaeologists, biologists, glaciologists, geographers, etc., from Russia and elsewhere work in the scientific research centre. There is also a year-round meteorological observatory and the northernmost cosmic rays station.

Education

Barentsburg has its own school serving the Russian community; in 2014 it had three teachers, with one for most subjects, one for music, and one for the English language. By 2014 its welfare funds had declined.

See also
 Pyramiden

Notes

References

The Economist: Arctic Norway - The Big Chill

External links

 Dream Town, Film Trailer
Barentsburg Research Base Official site
Barentsburg Cosmic Ray Station from the Polar Geophysical Institute
Map and guide, with photos in English Japanese version of site
 Barentsburg photos from Galen R Frysinger site
Many photos of Barentsburg on this flickr site
More photos of Barentsburg from a Svalbard site
Story on Barentsburg from the BBC, December 25, 2006

 
Norway–Soviet Union relations
Populated places in Svalbard
Populated places established in the 1920s
1920s establishments in Norway
Norway–Russia relations
Ethnic enclaves in Norway
Company towns in Norway
Pomors
Russian diaspora in Norway
Ukrainian diaspora in Europe